Luke Ryan Haines (born 15 October 2000) is an English professional footballer who plays as a midfielder for Hereford.

Early and personal life
Haines was born in Swindon and grew up in Highworth, Wiltshire. He supported Swindon Town as a child.

Career
He first joined Swindon Town's academy at the age of 6 in 2007 and signed his first contract aged 8, before signing his first professional contract with the club in May 2019. He joined National League South side Chippenham Town on loan in July 2019, and made his debut for the club in a 0–0 draw away to St Albans City on 3 August 2019, their opening game of the season. He won Chippenham Town's man of the match award for his performance. Haines scored his first goal for the club on 28 September 2020 with the opening goal of a 2–2 draw at home to Dulwich Hamlet. He returned to Swindon Town in December 2019, having made 20 league appearances, scoring once, for Chippenham.

He rejoined Chippenham Town on loan until the end of the season in February 2020. His first appearance back at Chippenham came on 8 February 2020 in a 1–0 victory away to Hemel Hempstead Town, before scoring his second goal for Chippenham in their following match with the only goal of a 1–0 victory at home to Maidstone United. He made 5 appearances over this spell, scoring once, prior to the early suspension of the season in March 2020 due to the COVID-19 pandemic.

He joined Hereford on loan on 2 October 2020 on a three-month loan. He appeared three times in the National League North before being recalled later that month. Haines made his debut for Swindon Town on 10 November 2020 in a 1–0 EFL Trophy victory away to Forest Green Rovers. On 26 December 2020, Haines rejoined Hereford on a three-month loan deal.

Haines was subsequently signed on a permanent basis by Hereford on 17 May 2021.

Career statistics

References

External links
 

2000 births
Living people
English footballers
Sportspeople from Swindon
Footballers from Wiltshire
Association football midfielders
Swindon Town F.C. players
Chippenham Town F.C. players
Hereford F.C. players
National League (English football) players